Brian Cox is a former American football coach. He served as the head coach at Quincy University in Quincy, Illinois from 1997 to 1999, compiling a record of 8–23. Prior to that, he had served as an assistant at both Quincy and Iowa Central Community College.

Head coaching record

References

Year of birth missing (living people)
Living people
American football defensive ends
Missouri State Bears football coaches
Quincy Hawks football coaches
Western Illinois Leathernecks football players
Junior college football coaches in the United States